Kittipol Paphunga (born November 2, 1983) is a former professional footballer from Thailand. He is the brother of Kittipoom Paphunga.

Honours

Club
Muangthong United
 Thai Premier League Champions (2) : 2010, 2012

External links
Profile at Thaipremierleague.co.th

1983 births
Living people
Kittipol Paphunga
Kittipol Paphunga
Association football midfielders
Kittipol Paphunga
Kittipol Paphunga
Kittipol Paphunga
Kittipol Paphunga
Kittipol Paphunga
Kittipol Paphunga
Kittipol Paphunga
Kittipol Paphunga
Kittipol Paphunga
Kittipol Paphunga
Footballers at the 2006 Asian Games
Kittipol Paphunga